Hamad Khaled Mohamed is a Kuwaiti footballer. He competed in the men's tournament at the 1980 Summer Olympics.

References

External links
 

Year of birth missing (living people)
Living people
Kuwaiti footballers
Kuwait international footballers
Olympic footballers of Kuwait
Footballers at the 1980 Summer Olympics
Place of birth missing (living people)
Association footballers not categorized by position
Kuwait Premier League players